Francisco Tena Guimerà (29 September 1901 - 6 August 1954), also known as Tena II, was a Spanish footballer who played as a forward for RCD Espanyol.

Club career
Born in Cabanes, he moved to Sabadell at a very young age for family reasons. In 1920 he joined the first team of CE Sabadell, where he shared a dressing room with his brothers Juan (Tena I) and Josep (Tena III), and thus, in order to avoid confusion, they started appearing as Tena I, II and III on the scoreboards. In March 1928, together with his brother Juan and at the same time as Crisant Bosch and Julio Káiser, he signed for Espanyol. He played a pivotal role in helping the club to win the 1928–29 Catalonia championship and reach the 1929 Copa del Rey Final, in which he scored the opening goal of an 2–1 win over Real Madrid, thus contributing decisively to the first-ever Copa del Rey title in the history of Espanyol. In 1931 he returned briefly to Sabadell before ending his career.

International career
He represented the Catalonia national team 8 times, scoring once, in a 9–0 win over a representing team of Brussels on 16 June 1927.

References

1901 births
1954 deaths
Sportspeople from the Province of Castellón
Footballers from Barcelona
Spanish footballers
Association football forwards
CE Sabadell FC footballers
RCD Espanyol footballers
Catalonia international footballers